Paraliotipoma is a genus of small sea snails with calcareous opercula, marine gastropod mollusks in the family Colloniidae.

Species
Species within the genus Paraliotipoma include:
 Paraliotipoma sirenkoi McLean, 2012

References

External links
 World Register of Marine Species

Colloniidae
Monotypic gastropod genera